Turquoise Coast may refer to:

 Turkish Riviera
 Turquoise Coast (Western Australia)

See also 
Coral reef